Marrie Bot (born June 24, 1946) is a Dutch photographer and graphic designer.

Biography 
Born in Bergambacht, Bot started her career in 1963 as graphic designer. She received some formal art education at the Vrije Academie in The Hague in the 1973/74 academic year. 

Since 1976 she more and more started focussing on photography, and settled as independent artist in Rotterdam. She experimented with several forms of photography from portrait photography, street photography, documentary photography, and nude photography to photojournalism.

In her work Bot has often chosen those socio-political themes which are a taboo. She researched and studied her subjects at length before she presented her work. Subjects she pictured have been massive pilgrimages in Europe in 1984, mentally handicapped in 1988, and multicultural funeral and mourning rituals in the Netherlands in 1998.

Bot was awarded the Maria Austria Photography Prize in 1989 for her photobook 'Bezwaard bestaan' on mentally handicapped people and the Dr A.H. Heineken Prize for Art in 1990 for her complete oeuvre.

See also 
 List of women photographers

Selected publications 
 Marrie Bot, Miserere: de grote boetebedevaarten in Europa, 1984
 Marrie Bot, Miserere: The great pilgrimages of penance in Europe. Rotterdam: Marrie Bot, 1985. . An English-language version of the Dutch-language book.
 Marrie Bot, Bezwaard bestaan : foto's en verhalen over verstandelijk gehandicapten. 1988. .
 Marrie Bot, Fotoboek over bedevaartgangers in plaatsen in o.a. Spanje, Polen en Ierland. 1989.
 Marrie Bot, Amsterdam (Netherlands). Stedelijk Museum (1990), Marrie Bot, photographer.  
 Marrie Bot, Een laatste groet: uitvaart- en rouwrituelen in multicultureel Nederland, M. Bot. 1998.

References

External links 
 Marrie Bot portfolio
 Marrie Bot at fotomuseumdenhaag.nl

1946 births
Living people
Dutch photographers
Dutch graphic designers
People from Bergambacht
Dutch women photographers
Women graphic designers